The Bremische Bürgerschaft (State Parliament of Bremen, literally “Bremish Citizenry” or “Citizenry of Bremen”) is the legislative branch of the Free Hanseatic City of Bremen in Germany. The state parliament elects the members of the Senate (executive), exercises oversight of the executive, and passes legislation. It currently consists of 83 members from seven parties. The current majority is a coalition of the Social Democratic Party, Alliance '90/The Greens and The Left (Die Linke), supporting Mayor and Senate president Andreas Bovenschulte. The 68 delegates of the city of Bremen also form the Stadtbürgerschaft (the local parliament of the city), while Bremerhaven has its own local parliament.

Current composition
After the elections of 26 May 2019, the composition of the Bürgerschaft is as follows:

Composition (June 2018)

After the elections of 10 May 2015, the composition of the Bürgerschaft is as follows:

Elections are conducted using proportional representation systems in both voting districts Bremen (68 seats) and Bremerhaven (15 seats), with a minimum of 5% vote share per voting district to receive any seats. The 5% rule is used separately, thus allowing the German People's Union to join the Bürgerschaft by winning 5.7% of the votes in Bremerhaven while winning only 2.75% in the whole state of Bremen.

The 68 members from Bremen also form the Stadtbürgerschaft (city council for the City of Bremen only), which is elected by an extended electorate: the minimum age for voting is 16 instead of 18 and all citizens of the European Union are allowed to vote. It is the only German state parliament with a 4-year, rather than 5-year term. These additional votes created a green Stadtbürgerschaft-only member and a SPD non-Stadtbürgerschaft member from Bremen(City) after the 2003 elections.

In 1979, the Bremer Grüne Liste managed to join the Bürgerschaft, thus being the first Green Party to ever enter a German Landtag.

Presidents of the Bürgerschaft
So far, the presidents of the Landtag of Bremen have been:
 1946–1966 August Hagedorn, Social Democratic Party (SPD)
 1966–1971 Hermann Engel, Social Democratic Party (SPD)
 1971–1995 Dieter Klink, Social Democratic Party (SPD)
 1995–1999 Reinhard Metz, Christian Democratic Union (CDU)
 1999–2019 Christian Weber, Social Democratic Party (SPD)
 2019 Antje Grotheer, SPD
 since 2019 Frank Imhoff, Christian Democratic Union (CDU)

See also

 1999 Bremen state election
 2003 Bremen state election
 2007 Bremen state election

The House of the Parliament
The House of the Parliament officially opened in September 1966. Bremen’s parliament building is called ‘Haus der Bürgerschaft’. The building has a frame construction of iron-reinforced concrete. The sheathing of glass has been hung in front of this construction. The height of the building is approximately that of the level of the eaves of both the Town Hall und the house 'Schütting'. The folded roof was a compromise solution conceived as a means for converging and linking the building with the older buildings surrounding the historic market square. The facade of the parliament building reflects the old buildings in the mirror-like surface of the glass sheathing. Artificial reliefs made of aluminum highlight the window sills.

External links
 
 

Politics of Bremen (state)
Bremen
History of Bremen (state)